Gesneria is a genus of moths of the family Crambidae.

Species
Gesneria centuriella (Denis & Schiffermüller, 1775)
Gesneria rindgeorum Munroe, 1972

References

Scopariinae
Crambidae genera
Taxa named by Jacob Hübner